Allochem is a term introduced by Folk to describe the recognisable "grains" in carbonate rocks. Any fragment from around 0.5 mm upwards in size may be considered an allochem. Examples would include ooids, peloids, oncolites, pellets, fossil or pre-existing carbonate fragments. Fragments are still termed allochems if they have undergone chemical transformations – for example if an aragonite shell were to dissolve and be later replaced by calcite, the replacement would still be deemed an allochem.

The allochems are typically embedded in a matrix of micrite (lime mud) or sparry calcite.

References

Sedimentology
Sedimentary rocks
Limestone